Ole Knudsen Nattestad (1807–1886) was a Norwegian-American leader and pioneer immigrant settler. Together with his brother Ansten Nattestad, he played a key role in promoting immigration from Norway and for directing immigrants to southern Wisconsin and northern Illinois.

Biography
The Nattestad farm was in Veggli Parish of the Rollag district in Buskerud county. This area lies in the heart of the Numedal traditional region and valley, the westernmost valley in southeastern Norway. Ole and Ansten Nattestad immigrated to the United States in 1837. They soon joined a group of earlier Norwegian immigrants led by Ole Rynning living in the Beaver Creek Settlement in Iroquois County, Illinois.

In 1838, Ole Rynning died and the Beaver Creek settlement, hard hit by malaria, broke up. Ole Nattestad moved northward into Wisconsin, and in July, 1838, entered a claim in the Town of Clinton, Rock County. The settlement soon came to be known as the Jefferson Prairie Settlement and represented the first Norwegian immigrant settlement in Wisconsin.

At that same time, Ansten Nattestad returned to Norway to have the letters of Ole Rynning published.  The Norwegian author's observations would create an enormous stir in Norway. Some historians attribute increased numbers of nineteenth-century immigrants from Norway to the book's publication. A complete version of Ole Rynning's True Account of America (Norwegian: Sandfærdig Beretning om Amerika) with footnotes and background information can be found at the National Library of Norway in Oslo.

The return trip of Ansten Nattestad to Norway had been immediately instrumental in promoting interest in America. Ansten Nattestad organized more than a hundred emigrants and led them to Wisconsin arriving in September, 1839. Some joined the Nattestad brothers at Jefferson Prairie; others settled in nearby the Muskegoo Settlement.	
 
Today a Historic Marker situated off Wisconsin Highway 140, south  of Clinton, Wisconsin marks the former location of the Jefferson Prairie Settlement and highlights the role of Ole Knutson Nattestad and Ansten Nattestad in its development.

References

Other sources
Blegen, Theodore C. Norwegian Migration to America, The American Transition. (Norwegian-American Historical Association, Northfield, MN. 1931)
Anderson, Rasmus Bjorn The First Chapter of Norwegian Immigration, 1821-1840, Its Causes and Results(Madison, Wisconsin : R.B. Anderson, 1896)
Ulvestad, Martin Nordmaendene i Amerika: Deres Historie og Rekord (translated by Olaf Kringhaug by Martin Ulvestad, 1907)

Related Reading
 Nattestad,  Ole Knudsen  (1995)  Beskrivelse over en reise til Nordamerica i 1837    (Drammen: Lyche Grafisk)

External links
Emigration, the Promise of America
National Library of Oslo: Ole Rynning's True Account of America translated and edited by Theodore C. Blegen
Telelaget of America
Jefferson Prairie Settlement Historic Marker
Jefferson Prairie Cemetery

1807 births
1886 deaths
People from Rollag
Norwegian emigrants to the United States
American Lutherans
People from Clinton, Rock County, Wisconsin
19th-century Lutherans